Shiv nagar is a hamlet near Bibipur Jalalabad village on the outskirts of Jhinjhana town in Shamli district in Uttar Pradesh, India.

History 
In June 2011, Snapdeal installed 15 hand pumps so that villagers would no longer need to walk for miles to fetch drinking water. The hamlet was facing shortage of clean water. To express their gratitude, residents erected a board naming the hamlet "Snapdeal.com Nagar" in addition to Shiv nagar.

References 

Villages in Shamli district